Edward John Jackett (4 July 1878 – 11 November 1935), known as John Jackett, was an English rugby union player, who represented the England national rugby union team, the British Lions, and competed in the 1908 Summer Olympics for Great Britain. He is the elder brother of Richard ″Dick″ Jackett, who was also in the Great Britain team which won the Olympic silver medal.

Early years

He was born in Falmouth, Cornwall, and played for Falmouth RFC.  On 8 February 1901 Jackett appeared at Falmouth County Court for the non-payment of damages to Caroline Amelia Oliver of Portscatho, for a breach-of -promise of marriage. He had been ordered in the High Court, the previous February, to pay £150 damages and £39 costs. His employment, at the time of the County Court case, was stated to be an artist's model and he lived at Henry Tuke's residence. A month later, on 8 March, he was ordered to pay 5 shillings monthly. On 11 May 1901, he left for Kimberley in South Africa on  the steamer Briton, travelling with two other rugby players, W Christophers and F Toy, where they joined the Cape Mounted Police. He returned to Cornwall and became Cornish Cycling champion.

Rugby union career
He joined Leicester Tigers in 1904 and played 183 times for the club over the next seven years. He also represented Cornwall 52 times and was capped for England thirteen times between 1905 and 1909. He also played against the touring South Africa team on their 1906 tour of Great Britain, and took part in the 1908 British Lions tour to New Zealand and Australia. Jackett was also a member of the Cornish rugby union team which, representing Great Britain, won the 1908 Olympic silver medal on 26 October 1908.

Rugby league career
In 1911 Jackett moved north to manage a theatre in Dewsbury, and joined Northern Rugby Football Union (rugby league) club Dewsbury, he played  in Dewsbury's 8-5 victory over Oldham in the 1911–12 Challenge Cup Final during the 1911-12 season at Headingley Rugby Stadium, Leeds on Saturday 27 April 1912 in front of a crowd of 16,000.

See also

 Rugby union in Cornwall
 Rugby union at the 1908 Summer Olympics

References

External links
(archived by web.archive.org) Profile

1878 births
1935 deaths
British & Irish Lions rugby union players from England
Cornish rugby union players
Dewsbury Rams players
England international rugby union players
English rugby league players
English rugby union players
Leicester Tigers players
Medalists at the 1908 Summer Olympics
Olympic rugby union players of Great Britain
Olympic silver medallists for Great Britain
Rugby league fullbacks
Rugby league players from Falmouth, Cornwall
Rugby union fullbacks
Rugby union players from Falmouth, Cornwall
Rugby union players at the 1908 Summer Olympics